Live at Hammersmith Odeon is a live album by Black Sabbath recorded at three concerts between 31 December 1981 and 2 January 1982, during the Mob Rules tour. It was released by Rhino Handmade on 1 May 2007 in a limited edition of 5000, which sold out immediately.

The songs "Country Girl" and "Slipping Away" made their debut on an official live release.

The CD was released only as a digipak, featuring a mini reproduction of a tour programme. Although a UK tour programme for the Mob Rules dates was produced, the one included with this release was for the January 1981 UK dates, which were part of the Heaven and Hell tour. The cover photo is also from the earlier tour.

The 2010 two-disc deluxe edition of Mob Rules included Live at Hammersmith Odeon on its second disc.

Track listing

Personnel
Ronnie James Dio – vocals
Tony Iommi – guitar
Geezer Butler – bass guitar
Vinnie Appice – drums, percussion
Geoff Nicholls – keyboards

See also

References

External links
Discography Entry from Black-Sabbath.com (includes misc. notes, gig breakdown, and serial numbered copies found)

Black Sabbath live albums
2007 live albums
Rhino Handmade live albums
Albums recorded at the Hammersmith Apollo